Samuel Peter Prakash is an Indian bishop. He is the current archbishop and metropolitan of the Anglican Church of India (CIBC), a continuing Anglican church which is part of the Traditional Anglican Communion and outside of the Anglican Communion. 

Prakash was consecrated as a bishop of the Anglican Church of India on 6 October 1984 at the YMCA Hall in New Delhi by Louis Falk, assisted by James Orin Mote and John Asa Prakash. He was initially assigned as the bishop ordinary for Lucknow, India. He was appointed as the acting primate of the Traditional Anglican Communion on 1 March 2012.

References

External links
Anglican Church of India official website
Traditional Anglican Communion official website

Living people
Indian Continuing Anglicans
Primates of the Traditional Anglican Communion
21st-century Anglican archbishops
Year of birth missing (living people)